The following is a list of notable deaths in May 2020.

Entries for each day are listed alphabetically by surname. A typical entry lists information in the following sequence:
 Name, age, country of citizenship at birth, subsequent country of citizenship (if applicable), reason for notability, cause of death (if known), and reference.

May 2020

1
Mathew Anikuzhikattil, 77, Indian Syro-Malabar Catholic hierarch, Bishop of Idukki (2003–2018).
Allah Yar Ansari, 77, Pakistani politician, MPA (1997–1999), COVID-19.
Beth Ashley, 93, American author and columnist.
Else Blangsted, 99, German-born American music editor (The Goonies, Star Trek IV: The Voyage Home, The Color Purple).
Chung Hae-won, 60, South Korean football player (Daewoo Royals, national team) and manager (Jeonnam Dragons), liver cancer.
Gilbert Luis R. Centina III, 72, Filipino-American Roman Catholic poet, complications from COVID-19.
Lajos Engler, 91, Serbian basketball player (Partizan, Proleter Zrenjanin).
Judith Esser-Mittag, 98, German gynecologist.
Ruy Fausto, 85, Brazilian philosopher, heart attack.
Deb Foskey, 70, Australian politician, ACT MLA (2004–2008), lung cancer.
Anne Heaton, 89, British ballet dancer.
Ben Hoekendijk, 81, Dutch evangelist.
Sachiko Honda, 89, Japanese Go player.
Christophe Keckeis, 75, Swiss lieutenant general, Chief of the General Staff (2003) and Armed Forces (2004–2007).
Matt Keough, 64, American baseball player (Oakland Athletics), pulmonary embolism.
Silvia Legrand, 93, Argentine actress (Educating Niní, Seven Women).
África Lorente Castillo, 65, Spanish politician, member of the Catalan parliament (1984–1988), COVID-19.
Augustine Mahiga, 74, Tanzanian diplomat and politician, Minister of Justice (since 2019) and Permanent Representative to the UN (2003–2010).
Elaine McCart, 91, American politician, member of the South Dakota Senate (1975–1976).
Francis Megahy, 85, British film director (The Great Riviera Bank Robbery, Taffin), cancer.
Patrick D. Miller, 84, American biblical scholar.
Benjamín Moreno, 65, Spanish footballer (Leganés).
Dolf Niezen, 94, Dutch footballer (ADO).
Derek Ogg, 65, Scottish lawyer.
Patrick W. O'Reilly, 95, American politician, member of the Arizona House of Representatives (1955–1956).
Louis Pastore, 88, American politician, member of the Rhode Island Senate (1971–1976).
Reuben Perach, 87, Israeli Olympic basketball player (1952).
Tony Rand, 80, American politician, member of the North Carolina Senate (1981–1988, 1995–2009), skin and throat cancer.
Samuel Rivera, 73, American politician, mayor of Passaic, New Jersey (2001–2008).
Antonina Ryzhova, 85, Russian volleyball player, world champion (1956, 1960) and Olympic silver medallist (1964).
Mutsuaki Sanada, 77, Japanese racing driver.
Fernando Sandoval, 77, Brazilian Olympic water polo player (1968), complications from COVID-19.
Simon Schenk, 73, Swiss ice hockey coach (national team) and politician, National Councillor (1994–2011).
Nancy Stark Smith, 68, American contact improvisation dancer, ovarian cancer.
Graham Stevenson, 69, British historian, cancer.
Tun Tin, 99, Burmese military officer and politician, Prime Minister (1988).
Ryan Wetnight, 49, American football player (Chicago Bears, Green Bay Packers), stomach cancer.
Georgios Zaimis, 82, Greek sailor, Olympic champion (1960).
Pankaj Zaveri, 75, Indian cricketer (Gujarat).
Sabine Zimmermann, 68, German TV presenter (Aktenzeichen XY… ungelöst).

2
Justa Barrios, American home care worker and labor organizer, COVID-19. (death announced on this date)
Morris Belzberg, 90, Canadian-born American businessman and sports team owner (Pittsburgh Penguins).
Sue Bruce-Smith, 62, British film producer (Widows, Dirt Music, Dream Horse), cancer.
Richie Cole, 72, American jazz saxophonist and composer.
Jim Cross, 87, American ice hockey player and coach (University of Vermont), complications from COVID-19.
Maurice Dayan, 85, French psychoanalyst.
Louis Delsarte, 75, American artist.
John Paul Eberhard, 93, American research architect and academic, complications of COVID-19 and congestive heart failure.
Cady Groves, 30, American singer-songwriter.
Jimmy Grundy, 97, American politician, member of the Kentucky House of Representatives (1956–1958).
Shady Habash, 24, Egyptian media producer and political prisoner.
Jim Henderson, 79, Canadian politician, Ontario MLA (1985–1995), complications from Parkinson's disease and COVID-19.
Samuel Roger Horchow, 91, American theatre producer (Crazy for You) and mail order executive, cancer.
Htay Kywe, 68, Burmese politician, MP (since 2016), cancer.
Idir, 70, Algerian singer, pulmonary disease.
George Kauffman, 89, American chemist.
Jonathan Kelly, 72, Irish singer-songwriter.
Daniel S. Kemp, 83, American organic chemist, COVID-19.
Bing Liu, 37, American scientist, shot.
Munir Mangal, 70, Afghan general, commander of the National Police, COVID-19.
Ralph McGehee, 92, American intelligence officer, COVID-19.
Bernard Nyarko, Ghanaian actor, colon cancer.
John Ogilvie, 91, Scottish footballer (Hibernian, Leicester City, Mansfield Town), COVID-19.
Meyer Rubin, 96, American geologist, COVID-19.
Jan Saxl, 71, Czechoslovak-born British mathematician.
Gil Schwartz, 68, American humor columnist (Fortune, Esquire), author and television executive (CBS), heart attack.
Gilbert Sigrist, 82, French pianist.
Gennadiy Solodov, 85, Russian Olympic racewalker (1960, 1964).
Jan-Olof Strandberg, 93, Swedish actor (Wild Birds, Last Pair Out, Varning för Jönssonligan).
Erik Tandberg, 87, Norwegian engineer and space educator.
Ajay Kumar Tripathi, 62, Indian jurist, Chief Justice of Chhattisgarh High Court (2018–2019) and Judicial Member of Lokpal (since 2019), COVID-19 and heart attack.
Arif Wazir, 37, Pakistani politician (Pashtun Tahafuz Movement), shot.

3
Victoria Barbă, 93, Moldovan animated film director.
Selma Barkham, 93, Canadian maritime historian.
Mohamed Ben Omar, 55, Nigerien politician, vice-president of the National Assembly (2009–2010, 2011–2016), founder and president of the PSD (since 2015), COVID-19.
Stefan Burkart, 62, Swiss Olympic sprinter (1992, 1996) and sports coach.
Paul Cholakis, 91, Canadian football player (Winnipeg Blue Bombers).
Q. Todd Dickinson, 67, American lawyer, director of the U.S. Patent and Trademark Office (1999–2001).
Ömer Döngeloğlu, 52, Turkish theologian, writer and broadcaster, COVID-19.
Rosalind Elias, 90, American operatic mezzo-soprano, heart failure.
John Ericson, 93, German-born American actor (Bedknobs and Broomsticks, 7 Faces of Dr. Lao, Honey West), pneumonia.
Sir Peter Froggatt, 91, Northern Irish academic administrator and epidemiologist.
Dave Greenfield, 71, English keyboardist (The Stranglers), heart disease and COVID-19.
Tendol Gyalzur, 68, Tibetan-Swiss humanitarian, COVID-19.
Bill Hull, 79, American football player (Dallas Texans).
Pavle Jovanovic, 43, Serbian-American Olympic bobsledder (2006), suicide.
Eugene Kostyra, 72, Canadian politician, Manitoba MLA (1981–1988).
Roy Lester, 96, American football player (West Virginia) and coach (Richard Montgomery, Maryland), complications from COVID-19.
John Mahon, 82, American actor (Zodiac, Armageddon, L.A. Confidential).
K. S. Nissar Ahmed, 84, Indian poet and writer, cancer.
Chanut Piyaoui, 95, Thai hotelier, founder of Dusit International.
John Ridley, 68, English footballer (Port Vale, Leicester City, Chesterfield).
Rick Roberson, 72, American basketball player (Los Angeles Lakers, Cleveland Cavaliers, Portland Trail Blazers).
Salty Saltwell, 96, American baseball general manager (Chicago Cubs).
John Hugh Seiradakis, 72, Greek astronomer, co-founder of the European Astronomical Society, complications from cancer.
Phil Smith, 88, American politician, member of the Alabama House of Representatives (1967–1975).
Frederick C. Tillis, 90, American jazz saxophonist and composer.
June A. Willenz, 95, American military veterans advocate, heart attack.
Nancy Workman, 79, American politician, Mayor of Salt Lake County (2000–2004).
Zhang Qian'er, 91, Chinese chemist, member of the Chinese Academy of Sciences.

4
Aldir Blanc, 73, Brazilian songwriter, COVID-19.
James Malone Coleman, 90, American Episcopal Bishop of West Tennessee (1994–2001).
Najaf Daryabandari, 90, Iranian translator and writer.
Norma Doggett, 94, American actress (Seven Brides for Seven Brothers).
Baldwin Domingo, 93, American aviation historian and politician, member of the New Hampshire House of Representatives (1998–2000, 2004–2012).
Jean Erdman, 104, American dancer and choreographer.
Maria Galitzine, 31, Luxembourgian-born Russian interior designer and princess, cardiac aneurysm.
Marvin Hershkowitz, 89, American basketball player.
Motoko Fujishiro Huthwaite, 92, American preservationist, last surviving female Monuments Men, COVID-19.
Gunnar Larsson, 80, Swedish sports administrator, COVID-19.
Michael Lucas, 96, Czechoslovakian-born Canadian political activist.
Michael McClure, 87, American poet and writer, complications from a stroke.
Flávio Migliaccio, 85, Brazilian film director (The Beggars) and actor (My Home Is Copacabana, The Hour and Turn of Augusto Matraga), suicide by hanging.
Anna Mohr, 75, Swedish archaeologist, COVID-19.
Lorne Munroe, 95, Canadian-born American cellist.
Garba Nadama, 82, Nigerian politician, Governor of Sokoto (1982–1983).
Lucila Santos Trujillo, 91, Ecuadorian First Lady (1966–1968).
Don Shula, 90, American Hall of Fame football player (Cleveland Browns, Baltimore Colts) and coach (Miami Dolphins).
Marion Hartzog Smoak, 103, American politician, Chief of Protocol (1972–1974) and South Carolina state senator (1967–1968).
Alan Sutherland, 76, New Zealand rugby union player (Marlborough, national team).
Álvaro Teherán, 54, Colombian basketball player (Baloncesto Málaga, Fort Wayne Fury, KK Olimpija), kidney failure.
Froilan Tenorio, 80, Northern Marianan politician, Governor (1994–1998) and Resident Representative (1984–1990).
Dragan Vučić, 64, Macedonian composer and singer, COVID-19.
Cedric Xulu, 80, South African footballer (AmaZulu F.C.), cancer.
Greg Zanis, 69, American carpenter and activist, bladder cancer.

5
Sergei Adian, 89, Russian mathematician (Adian–Rabin theorem).
Renee Amoore, 67, American politician and health care consultant, deputy chair of the Republican State Committee of Pennsylvania (since 1996).
Sweet Pea Atkinson, 74, American singer (Was (Not Was)), heart attack.
Brian Axsmith, 57, American paleobotanist, COVID-19.
Johanna Bassani, 18, Austrian Nordic combined skier, Youth Olympic silver medalist (2020), suicide.
Wayne Burkes, 90, American politician and lieutenant general, member of the Mississippi House of Representatives (1976–1980) and Senate (1980–1990).
Sonny Cox, 82, American saxophonist and basketball coach (King College Prep).
Max Crellin, 86, Australian politician, member of the Victorian Legislative Assembly (1970–1982).
John Dallat, 73, Irish politician, MLA (1998–2016, 2017–2020), cancer.
Claud M. Davis, 95, American engineer.
Stéphane Dupont, 70, Belgian radio host and producer.
Michael Friedman, 59, American author and poet, cancer.
Jan Halvarsson, 77, Swedish cross-county skier, Olympic silver medallist (1968).
George Henderson, 84, Canadian politician, member of the House of Commons (1980–1988).
Kjell Karlsen, 88, Norwegian composer and bandleader.
Didi Kempot, 53, Indonesian campursari singer, heart attack.
Kiing Shooter, 24, American rapper, liver failure reportedly complicated by COVID-19.
Diran Manoukian, 101, French Olympic field hockey player (1948, 1952, 1960).
Ann McBride Norton, 75, American activist and businesswoman.
Azimulhaq Pahalwan, 54, Indian politician, Uttar Pradesh MLA (since 2012), complications from diabetes.
Ciro Pessoa, 62, Brazilian singer-songwriter (Titãs, Cabine C), journalist and poet, complications from cancer and COVID-19.
Connie Rea, 89, American basketball player (Baltimore Bullets).
Thomas Reppetto, 88, American police officer and author.
Alfred "Uganda" Roberts, 77, American percussionist (Professor Longhair, Dr. John), lung cancer.
Paulette Sarcey, 96, French resistance fighter.
Mimmo Sepe, 65, Italian comedian.
Millie Small, 72, Jamaican singer ("My Boy Lollipop"), stroke.
J. Denis Summers-Smith, 99, British ornithologist and engineer.
André Ungar, 90, Hungarian-born British Jewish philosopher.

6
Jane Alexander, 90, American politician, member of the Pennsylvania House of Representatives (1965).
Norbert Balatsch, 92, Austrian choral conductor (Vienna State Opera, Bayreuth Festival), Grammy winner (1981, 2002).
Hamid Bernaoui, 82, Algerian footballer (USM Alger).
Sir John Birch, 84, British diplomat, ambassador to Hungary (1989–1995), cancer.
Chrystelle Trump Bond, 82, American dancer, choreographer and author.
Dmitry Bosov, 52, Russian natural resource executive, head of supervisory board of HC Sibir Novosibirsk, suicide by gunshot.
Thomas Clark, 93, American politician, Mayor of Long Beach, California (1975–1980, 1982–1984).
Paul Doyle, 80, American baseball player (Atlanta Braves, California Angels, San Diego Padres).
Carlos Ernesto Escobar Mejía, 57, Salvadoran-born American immigrant, COVID-19.
Dalit Ezhilmalai, 74, Indian politician, MP (since 1998).
Barry Farber, 90, American Hall of Fame radio talk show host, linguist, and author.
Herbert Frankenhauser, 74, German politician, MP (1990–2013).
Brian Howe, 66, English rock singer (Bad Company), heart attack.
John Laver, 82, Indian-born British phonetician.
Jean Le Dû, 82, French linguist.
Darby McCarthy, 76, Australian jockey.
Cameron McGlenn, 32, American arena football player (New Orleans VooDoo, Iowa Barnstormers), traffic collision.
Habibur Rahman Mollah, 78, Bangladeshi politician, MP (1996–2001, since 2008), kidney disease.
Paddy Molloy, 85–86, Irish hurler (Offaly, Drumcullen).
Riyaz Naikoo, 35, Indian pro-Pakistani militant, shot.
Karen Neander, 66, American philosopher, cancer.
Antonio Piraíno, 91, Chilean Olympic equestrian (1968).
Leslie Pope, 65, American set decorator (Seabiscuit, Django Unchained, Avengers: Endgame).
Mary Pratt, 101, American baseball player (Rockford Peaches, Kenosha Comets).
Nahum Rabinovitch, 92, Canadian-born Israeli Orthodox rabbi and posek, head of Yeshivat Birkat Moshe.
Jacques Reymond, 69, Swiss ski trainer, COVID-19.
Vladimir Simonov, 84, Russian design engineer.
Martin Spellman, 94, American child actor.

7
Alfonsas Vincentas Ambraziūnas, 86, Lithuanian sculptor (Ninth Fort memorial).
Maria Teresa Beccari, 69, Sanmarinese politician, Mayor of City of San Marino (2009–2018).
Steve Blackmore, 58, Welsh rugby union player (national team), brain cancer.
Brian Bolus, 86, English cricketer (Yorkshire, Nottinghamshire, national team).
Princess Diana of Bourbon-Parma, 87, French royal, COVID-19.
Daniel Cauchy, 90, French film actor (Bob le flambeur, D'où viens-tu Johnny?, The Troops of St. Tropez) and producer.
Terry Clark, 101, British Royal Air Force officer (The Few).
E. Wayne Craven, 89, American art historian, complications from COVID-19.
Joyce Davidson, 89, Canadian television presenter, COVID-19.
Peque Gallaga, 76, Filipino film director (Oro, Plata, Mata, Scorpio Nights, Magic Temple), screenwriter and actor, pneumonia.
İbrahim Gökçek, 41, Turkish bass player (Grup Yorum), starvation following hunger strike.
Antonio González Pacheco, 73, Spanish Francoist police inspector (Political-Social Brigade), COVID-19.
Andre Harrell, 59, American record producer, founder of Uptown Records, heart failure.
Manuel Jove, 78, Spanish businessman, founder of Fadesa.
Abdiwali Olad Kanyare, 39, Somali footballer (Horseed, national team), shot.
Margaret Loutit, 90, Australian-born New Zealand microbiologist.
Daisy Lúcidi, 90, Brazilian actress (Paraíso Tropical, Babilônia, Passione), COVID-19.
John Macurdy, 91, American operatic bass.
Cecil Maguire, 90, Irish painter.
Elliott Mendelson, 88, American logician.
Sylvia Ostry, 92, Canadian economist.
Darrin Patrick, 49, American author and megachurch pastor, suicide by gunshot.
Eugenio Ravignani, 87, Italian Roman Catholic prelate, Bishop of Vittorio Veneto (1983–1997) and Trieste (1997–2009).
Richard Sala, 65, American cartoonist.
Mike Storen, 84, American basketball executive (Indiana Pacers, Atlanta Hawks), commissioner of the ABA, complications from cancer.
Arnold Stulce, 95, American politician, member of the Tennessee House of Representatives (1993–1996).
Ty, 47, British rapper, pneumonia and COVID-19.
Maks Velo, 84, French-born Albanian artist.
Carolyn Welch, 97, American figure skater.
Emile Wijntuin, 95, Surinamese politician, Chairman of the Staten (1973–1975) and of the National Assembly (1975–1980).
Dan Wood, 73, American soccer coach and golfer.
Joseph Zhu Baoyu, 98, Chinese Roman Catholic prelate, Bishop of Nanyang (2002–2010).

8
Mark Barkan, 85, American songwriter ("Pretty Flamingo", "The Tra La La Song (One Banana, Two Banana)", "She's a Fool").
Harry Berg, 76, American politician, member of the Montana Senate (1981–1985).
Lúcia Braga, 85, Brazilian politician, Deputy (1987–1995, 2003–2007), COVID-19.
Aart Brederode, 78, Dutch Olympic hockey player (1968).
Tomás Carlovich, 74, Argentine footballer (Rosario Central, Central Córdoba, Independiente Rivadavia), brain injury from fall during beating.
Jesus Chediak, 78, Brazilian actor, director and producer, COVID-19.
Sigma Faye Coran, 54, American rabbi, breast cancer.
J. J. Cribbin, 73, Irish Gaelic footballer (Ballyhaunis, Mayo).
Vicente André Gomes, 68, Brazilian politician, Deputy (1995–1999), complications from COVID-19.
Yuri Gryadunov, 90, Russian diplomat, ambassador to Jordan (1990–1992).
James Hill, 89, New Zealand Olympic rower (1956, 1960).
Roy Horn, 75, German-American magician (Siegfried & Roy), COVID-19.
Ben Johnson, 88, American baseball player (Chicago Cubs).
Dimitris Kremastinos, 78, Greek politician, MP (2000–2004, 2009–2019) and Minister of Health (1993–1996), COVID-19.
Adi Kurdi, 71, Indonesian actor (3 Hari Untuk Selamanya, Aku Ingin Menciummu Sekali Saja).
Byron Mallott, 77, American politician and Tlingit elder, Lieutenant Governor of Alaska (2014–2018), heart attack.
Nancy Morin, 44, Canadian goalball player.
David Nakdimen, 86, American broadcaster.
Jack Nielsen, 96, Norwegian Olympic alpine skier.
Cécile Rol-Tanguy, 101, French resistance officer.
Iepe Rubingh, 45, Dutch performance artist, co-founder of chess boxing.
Thérence Sinunguruza, 60, Burundian politician, MP (2005–2010), Permanent Representative to the UN (1993–1994) and Vice-President (2010–2013).
Carl Tighe, 70, British author and academic, COVID-19.
Ritva Valkama, 87, Finnish actress (Häpy Endkö? Eli kuinka Uuno Turhapuro sai niin kauniin ja rikkaan vaimon, Herr Puntila and His Servant Matti, Borrowing Matchsticks).

9
Johannes Beck, 97, German Jesuit priest and social ethicist, COVID-19.
Robert Bru, 89, French rugby union coach (Stade Toulousain, RC Narbonne).
Tony Carrillo, 83, American politician, member of the Arizona House of Representatives (1963–1969).
Arthur Dignam, 80, Australian actor (The Devil's Playground, Summer of Secrets, Strange Behavior).
Georges Domercq, 89, French rugby union referee and politician, mayor of Bellocq (1971–2014).
Brooks Douglass, 56, American politician, member of the Oklahoma Senate (1990–2002), cancer.
Freda Gardner, 91, American religion academic.
Timo Honkela, 57, Finnish computer scientist.
Carlos José, 85, Brazilian singer-songwriter, complications from COVID-19.
Kari Karanko, 79, Finnish diplomat.
Rich Kreitling, 84, American football player (Cleveland Browns).
Ahmad Kurd, 70, Palestinian politician, mayor of Deir al-Balah (since 2005), stroke.
Pedro Pablo León, 76, Peruvian footballer (Alianza Lima, Barcelona de Ecuador, national team), pneumonia and kidney failure.
Little Richard, 87, American Hall of Fame rock and roll singer ("Tutti Frutti", "Long Tall Sally", "Lucille"), pianist and songwriter, bone cancer.
Winona Littleheart, 64, American professional wrestler and valet (NWA, WWF), kidney disease.
Kristina Lugn, 71, Swedish poet and writer, member of the Swedish Academy.
Lidia Marchetti, 80, Italian basketball player.
Johnny McCarthy, 86, American basketball player (Cincinnati Royals, St. Louis Hawks, Boston Celtics).
Abraham Palatnik, 92, Brazilian kinetic artist, COVID-19.
Jorma Rissanen, 87, Finnish information theorist.
Jaquelin T. Robertson, 88, American architect and urban planner, Alzheimer's disease.
Geno Silva, 72, American actor (Scarface, Amistad, Key West), complications from frontotemporal degeneration. 
Sven-Erik Westlin, 86, Swedish Olympic weightlifter (1964).

10
Aldo Bassi, 58, Italian jazz trumpeter.
David H. Bayley, 87, American political scientist and criminologist.
David Corrêa, 82, Brazilian singer-songwriter, kidney failure brought on by COVID-19.
Lloyd Criss, 79, American politician, member of the Texas House of Representatives (1979–1991), anemia.
Lynn Deas, 67, American bridge player.
Charley Diamond, 83, American football player (BC Lions, Dallas Texans/Kansas City Chiefs).
Peter Elsbach, 95, Dutch physician.
Fritz Gerber, 91, Swiss business executive (Roche Group, Zurich Insurance).
Sai Gundewar, 42, Indian actor (David, I, Me Aur Main, Baazaar), brain cancer.
Anna Handzlová, Czech orienteer.
Trivo Inđić, 82, Serbian political advisor and diplomat, ambassador to Spain (2001–2004).
Neville Jayaweera, 89, Sri Lankan-English radio executive and civil servant.
Athar Shah Khan Jaidi, 76, Pakistani writer and actor, complications from a stroke.
Frances Kinne, 102, American educator, President of Jacksonville University (1979–1989).
José López Calo, 98, Spanish musicologist and priest.
Arva Moore Parks McCabe, 81, American historian and preservationist.
John McKenzie, 65, British bass guitarist.
Jack Mundey, 90, Australian trade unionist and environmental activist.
Khairi Nazarova, 90, Tajik actress and politician.
Nita Pippins, 93, American registered nurse and AIDS activist, COVID-19.
Sonny Parsons, 61, Filipino actor (Sparrow Unit, Agila) and singer (Hagibis), heart attack.
Martin Pasko, 65, Canadian-born American comic book writer (Superman, E-Man) and screenwriter (Batman: Mask of the Phantasm).
Sérgio Sant'Anna, 78, Brazilian writer, COVID-19.
Djoko Santoso, 67, Indonesian military officer, Army Chief of Staff (2005–2007) and Commander of the Armed Forces (2007–2010), complications from surgery.
Barbara Sher, 84, American motivational speaker and author.
Yogendra Singh, 87, Indian sociologist, heart attack.
John Teerlinck, 69, American football player (San Diego Chargers) and coach (Denver Broncos, Indianapolis Colts).
Hari Vasudevan, 68, Indian historian, COVID-19.
Mare Vint, 77, Estonian graphic artist.
Abdikani Mohamed Wa'ays, Somalian diplomat, Ambassador to Egypt and envoy to the Arab League, COVID-19.
Betty Wright, 66, American soul and R&B singer ("Clean Up Woman"), Grammy winner (1976), cancer.
Abraham Yakin, 95, Israeli artist.

11
Francisco Aguilar, 71, Spanish footballer (Real Madrid, Rayo Vallecano, national team).
Alberto Carpani, 64, Italian singer, COVID-19.
Paloma Cordero, 82, Mexican socialite, First Lady (1982–1988).
Ewie Cronje, 80, South African cricketer.
Herbert Dardik, 84, American vascular surgeon.
Terry Erwin, 79, American entomologist.
Will Forsyth, 24, English rugby league footballer (Dewsbury Rams), cancer.
Hutton Gibson, 101, American sedevacantism writer and Holocaust denier.
Larry Gowell, 72, American baseball player (New York Yankees), heart attack.
Thorkild Grosbøll, 72, Danish Lutheran clergyman.
Victor J. Hugo Jr., 88, American major general.
Anne Kernan, 87, Irish particle physicist.
Christian Kieckens, 69, Belgian architect and photographer.
Oleg Ivanovich Kovalyov, 71, Russian politician, governor of Ryazan Oblast (2008–2017).
Moon Martin, 69, American singer-songwriter ("Bad Case of Loving You (Doctor, Doctor)", "X-Ray Vision").
Doug McKay, 90, Canadian ice hockey player (Detroit Red Wings).
Ann Katharine Mitchell, 97, British cryptanalyst and psychologist, COVID-19.
Petr Nemšovský, 77, Slovak-born Czech triple jumper.
Jean Nichol, 75, Canadian singer.
Ietje Paalman-de Miranda, 85, Surinamese born Dutch mathematician and professor.
Roland Povinelli, 78, French politician, Senator (2008–2014), mayor of Allauch (since 1975), heart attack.
James R. Redmond, 91, American zoologist.
Andrea Rinaldi, 19, Italian footballer (Atalanta), brain aneurysm.
Gregorio Scalise, 80, Italian poet.
Zay N. Smith, 71, American journalist (Chicago Sun-Times), lung cancer.
Thyra Stevenson, 75, American politician, member of the Idaho House of Representatives (2012–2014, since 2016), heart attack.
Jerry Stiller, 92, American actor (Seinfeld, The King of Queens) and comedian (Stiller and Meara).
Miloslav Stingl, 89, Czech ethnologist and author.
Susan Subtle, 78, American art curator and columnist.
Tissa Wijesurendra, 71, Sri Lankan actor (Christhu Charithaya, Dadabima, Rupantharana).
Don Zimmerman, 70, American football player (Philadelphia Eagles).

12
George Akiyama, 77, Japanese manga artist (Zeni Geba, Haguregumo).
John Beattie, 87, Australian politician, Tasmanian MHA (1972–1989).
Frank Bolle, 95, American cartoonist (Winnie Winkle, The Heart of Juliet Jones).
Guillermo Capobianco Ribera, 74, Bolivian politician.
Felice Cece, 84, Italian Roman Catholic prelate, Bishop of Teano-Calvi (1984–1989) and Archbishop of Sorrento-Castellammare di Stabia (1989–2012).
Renée Claude, 80, Canadian actress (It's Your Turn, Laura Cadieux, Avec un grand A, He Shoots, He Scores) and singer, COVID-19.
Henriette Conté, Guinean socialite, First Lady (1984–2008).
Johnnie H. Corns, 84, American lieutenant general.
Renato Corti, 84, Italian Roman Catholic cardinal, Bishop of Novara (1990–2011).
S. David Freeman, 94, American engineer, author and attorney, chairman of the TVA, NYPA and LADWP,  heart attack.
Richard Gilder, 87, American brokerage executive and philanthropist.
David Green, 84, English cricketer (Derbyshire).
Morris Hood III, 54, American politician, member of the Michigan House of Representatives (2003–2008) and Senate (2011–2018), COVID-19.
Sisavath Keobounphanh, 92, Laotian military officer and politician, Vice President (1996–1998) and Prime Minister (1998–2001).
Astrid Kirchherr, 81, German photographer (The Beatles), cancer.
Claus Larsen, 65, Danish footballer (Køge BK, KB, national team).
Thomas M. Liggett, 76, American mathematician.
George Mikell, 91, Lithuanian-Australian actor (Kill Her Gently, The Guns of Navarone, The Great Escape).
Clarence Mini, 68, South African doctor and human rights activist, COVID-19.
Radim Novák, 42, Czech footballer (FK Litvínov, FK Ústí nad Labem), pancreatic cancer.
Michel Piccoli, 94, French actor (La Grande Bouffe, A Leap in the Dark, We Have a Pope), stroke.
Philippe Redon, 69, French footballer (Stade Rennais, Paris Saint-Germain, Stade Lavallois).
Carolyn Reidy, 71, American publisher, CEO of Simon & Schuster, heart attack.
Giulio Savelli, 78, Italian publisher and politician, Deputy (1996–2001).
Farzad Sharifian, Iranian-born Australian linguist.
Edin Sprečo, 73, Bosnian footballer (Željezničar, Iskra Bugojno, Yugoslavia national team).
Aimee Stephens, 59, American funeral director and transgender rights activist, kidney failure.
Ernest Vinberg, 82,  Russian mathematician (Vinberg's algorithm, Koecher–Vinberg theorem), complications from COVID-19.

13
Afwerki Abraha, 71, Eritrean diplomat, COVID-19.
Francis Andersen, 94, Australian scholar.
Ágnes Babos, 76, Hungarian handball player, world champion (1965).
Gabriel Bacquier, 95, French operatic baritone.
Anthony Bailey, 87, English writer and art historian, COVID-19.
Walter Bingham, 89, American sportswriter and golf historian, chronic lymphocytic leukemia.
Jean Lau Chin, 75, American clinical psychologist, COVID-19.
Tom Cox, 57, American football player.
Jack Delveaux, 83, American football player (Winnipeg Blue Bombers).
Gérard Dionne, 100, Canadian Roman Catholic prelate, Bishop of Edmundston (1983–1993).
Malibongwe Gcwabe, 55, South African gospel singer, asthma attack.
Gaetano Gorgoni, 86, Italian politician, Deputy (1983–1994).
Rolf Hochhuth, 89, German author and playwright (The Deputy).
Riad Ismat, 72, Syrian writer and theatre director, Minister of Culture (2010–2012), COVID-19.
Shobushi Kanji, 28, Japanese sumo wrestler, COVID-19-related pneumonia.
Chedli Klibi, 94, Tunisian politician, Minister of Culture (1961–1970, 1971–1973, 1976–1978) and Secretary General of the Arab League (1979–1990).
Giorgio Kutufà, 72, Italian politician, President of the province of Livorno (2004–2014).
Derek Lawrence, 78, English record producer (Deep Purple, Wishbone Ash).
Clive Limpkin, 82, British photojournalist.
Keith Lyons, 68, Welsh-born Australian sports scientist.
Michael Madhu, 50, Indian actor (Bhajarangi, Shhh!, Ashwamedha), heart attack.
John O'Brien, 88, Australian Olympic water polo player (1956, 1960).
Jeremiah F. O'Connor, 86, American politician, member of the New Jersey Senate (1966–1968), Bergen County Freeholder (1975–1980).
Garland Shifflett, 85, American baseball player (Washington Senators, Minnesota Twins).
Patrick Simon, 64, French politician, Mayor of Villers-Bretonneux (since 2008), advocate of Australia–France relations, COVID-19.
Andy Thompson, 57, American politician, member of the Ohio House of Representatives (2011–2018).
Yoshio, 70, Mexican singer, COVID-19.
Daren Zenner, 48, Canadian-American boxer.

14
Anisuzzaman, 83, Bangladeshi academic, COVID-19.
Tessie Aquino-Oreta, 75, Filipino politician, MP (1987–2004).
Berith Bohm, 87, Swedish operatic soprano.
Bertram S. Brown, 89, American psychiatrist, director of the National Institute of Mental Health (1970–1977), cardiovascular disease.
Guido Cerniglia, 81, Italian actor (The Scientific Cardplayer, Alla mia cara mamma nel giorno del suo compleanno, Il giustiziere di mezzogiorno).
Hans Cohen, 97, Dutch microbiologist, COVID-19.
Tony Coll, 70, New Zealand rugby league player (West Coast, national team), heart attack.
Dalila Ennadre, 53, Moroccan film director (J'ai tant aimé...).
Ingvar Ericsson, 92, Swedish Olympic runner (1952, 1956).
Phyllis George, 70, American sportscaster (The NFL Today), First Lady of Kentucky (1979–1983), and beauty queen (Miss America 1971), polycythemia vera.
Joey Giambra, 86, American jazz musician, playwright and actor, COVID-19.
Henryk Jaskuła, 96, Polish yachtsman.
Albert Krieger, 96, American defense lawyer. 
Attila Ladinszky, 70, Hungarian footballer (Tatabánya, Feyenoord, Anderlecht), heart attack.
Ray Land, 89, Australian Olympic sprinter (1956).
Ronald Ludington, 85, American figure skater, Olympic bronze medalist (1960).
Khalid Mahmood, 94, Pakistani Islamic scholar and writer, complications from a broken hip.
Bhabani Charan Pattanayak, 98, Indian politician, MP (1961–1972, 1978–1984).
Pepper Rodgers, 88, American football player and coach (Kansas Jayhawks, UCLA Bruins, Georgia Tech Yellow Jackets), complications from a fall.
Sally Rowley, 88, American jeweler and civil rights activist, COVID-19.
Debesh Roy, 83, Indian writer, cardiac arrest.
Jorge Santana, 68, Mexican guitarist (Malo).
Ronald J. Shurer, 41, American army medic, recipient of Medal of Honor, complications from lung cancer.
William W. Snavely, 100, American Air Force lieutenant general.
Michel Souplet, 91, French politician, Senator (1983–2001).
Czesław Stanula, 80, Polish-born Brazilian Roman Catholic prelate, Bishop of Floresta (1989–1997) and Itabuna (1997–2017).
Jim Tucker, 87, American basketball player (Syracuse Nationals, Harlem Globetrotters), complications from Alzheimer's disease.
Bob Watson, 74, American baseball player (Houston Astros, New York Yankees, Atlanta Braves) and executive (New York Yankees), kidney disease.
Larry W. Womble, 78, American politician, member of the North Carolina House of Representatives (1994–2012).

15
José Rodrigo Aréchiga Gamboa, 39, Mexican cartel leader, shot.
Gurdas Singh Badal, 88, Indian politician, MP (1971–1977).
Frank Bielec, 72, American interior designer (Trading Spaces, While You Were Out), heart attack.
Herbert Blendinger, 84, Austrian composer and violist.
Claes Borgström, 75, Swedish lawyer and politician, Equality Ombudsman (2000–2007), COVID-19.
Ezio Bosso, 48, Italian composer (I'm Not Scared), pianist and conductor, neurodegenerative illness.
Bob Cline, 87, American politician, member of the California State Assembly (1971–1981).
Denny DeMarchi, 57, Canadian multi-instrumentalist (Alias, Killer Bee, The Cranberries), cancer.
Sergio Denis, 71, Argentine singer, songwriter and actor, complications from a fall.
Paddy Fenning, 69, Irish Gaelic footballer (Tullamore, Offaly), amyotrophic lateral sclerosis.
Juan Genovés, 89, Spanish painter and graphic artist.
Ernie Gonzalez, 59, American golfer, complications from Alzheimer's disease.
Bruno Graf, 66, Swiss footballer (FC Basel), cancer.
Mitch Greenlick, 85, American politician, member of the Oregon House of Representatives (since 2003).
Shri Krishna Joshi, 84, Indian physicist.
Frederick Kantor, 77, American physicist and inventor.
Allen Lee, 80, Hong Kong industrialist and politician, member of the Legislative Council (1978–1998) and Chairman of the Liberal Party (1993–1998).
Kurt Liederer, 92, Austrian Olympic diver.
Sergio Marchant, 58, Chilean football player (Arturo Fernández Vial, Antofagasta, national team) and manager.
Phil May, 75, English singer (The Pretty Things), complications following hip surgery.
Paul McCurrie, 91, American politician, New Jersey assemblyman (1962–1964), COVID-19.
Rick Muru, 69, New Zealand rugby league player (Waikato, national team).
Franco Nenci, 85, Italian boxer, Olympic silver medallist (1956).
Tom O'Donoghue, 79, Irish hurler.
John Palmer, 77, Canadian theatre and film director. 
Sandro Petrone, 66, Italian journalist, lung cancer.
Henrik Pontén, 54, Swedish jurist, complications from a traffic collision.
Muthappa Rai, 68, Indian restaurateur, brain cancer.
Francisco Sanz, Spanish Olympic sport shooter.
Olga Savary, 86, Brazilian writer and poet.
Ralph Sorenson, 93, Canadian politician, cancer.
Steve Spray, 79, American golfer.
Monk Tate, 86, American racing driver.
Henri Vergon, 51, Belgian-born art dealer, heart attack.
Fred Willard, 86, American actor (Best in Show, Fernwood 2 Night, Modern Family) and comedian, heart attack.
Ye Yonglie, 79, Chinese writer.

16
Julio Anguita, 78, Spanish politician, Secretary General of the Communist Party (1988–1998), mayor of Córdoba (1979–1986) and coordinator of United Left (1989–2000), heart attack.
Larry Aubry, 86, American columnist and activist.
Rodger Bird, 76, American football player (Oakland Raiders, Kentucky Wildcats).
Gerard Brady, 83, Irish politician, Minister for Education (1982) and TD (1977–1992).
Émile Chaline, 98, French admiral and resistance fighter.
Chung Chao-cheng, 95, Taiwanese writer.
Mário Chermont, 83, Brazilian politician, COVID-19.
Laurie Craker, 67, English football player (Watford, Hayes) and manager (Flackwell Heath), cancer.
Jacques Crevoisier, 72, French football coach, cardiac arrest.
Cliff Eyland, 65, Canadian painter and writer.
Frances Goldin, 95, American housing rights activist and literary agent. 
Eusebio Grados, 66, Peruvian huayno singer, cardiac arrest.
Mizban Khadr al-Hadi, 81, Iraqi military officer, member of the Revolutionary Command Council (1991–2001).
Him Chhem, 82, Cambodian politician, MP (since 2003).
Wilson Roosevelt Jerman, 91, American White House butler and staffer (1957–2012), COVID-19.
Hossein Kazempour Ardebili, 67, Iranian politician, Minister of Commerce (1980–1981) and representative to OPEC (1995–2008, since 2013), brain haemorrhage.
James Gordon Kelly, 90, American psychologist.
Raine Loo, 75, Estonian actress (Georg). 
Michael McCaskey, 76, American sports executive, president of the Chicago Bears (1983–1999), leukemia.
Monique Mercure, 89, Canadian actress (Naked Lunch, The Red Violin, J.A. Martin Photographer), cancer.
René Moreu, 99, French painter and illustrator.
A. T. Pathrose, 88, Indian politician, Kerala MLA (1965).
Pilar Pellicer, 82, Mexican actress (The Life of Agustín Lara, Day of the Evil Gun, La Choca), COVID-19.
Constantin Radu, 75, Romanian footballer (Argeș Pitești).
Azad Rahman, 76, Bangladeshi composer.
Gene Rossides, 92, American politician and football player (Columbia Lions).
Lynn Shelton, 54, American film and television director (Humpday, Your Sister's Sister, Fresh Off the Boat), blood disorder.
Chuck Sieminski, 79, American football player (San Francisco 49ers, Atlanta Falcons).
Arthur Summons, 84, Australian rugby football player (Western Suburbs, national rugby league and rugby union team), namesake of the Provan-Summons Trophy.
László Szabó, 85, Hungarian Grand Prix motorcycle road racer.
Donn Trenner, 93, American jazz pianist.
K. Varadarajan, 73, Indian politician.
Jon Whiteley, 75, Scottish child actor (The Kidnappers, The Spanish Gardener) and historian.
Tony Yates, 82, American college basketball player and coach (Cincinnati Bearcats).
Donald Yeagley, 100, American politician, member of the Indiana House of Representatives (1959–1963) and Senate (1963–1965).

17
Wilson Braga, 88, Brazilian politician, Paraíba MLA (1955–1967, 2011–2015), Deputy (1967–1982, 1995–2003, 2007–2011) and Governor of Paraíba (1983–1987), COVID-19.
José Cutileiro, 85, Portuguese diplomat and writer, Secretary General of the Western European Union (1994–1999).
Du Wei, 57, Chinese diplomat, ambassador to Ukraine (2016–2020) and Israel (since 2020).
Vormsi Enn, 76, Estonian esotericist.
Hermann Fellner, 69, German politician, MP (1980–1990), heart attack.
Colin Franklin, 96, English writer and bibliographer.
Shad Gaspard, 39, American professional wrestler (WWE) and actor (Get Hard, From Dusk till Dawn: The Series), drowning.
Hans-Joachim Gelberg, 89, German writer and publisher.
Ernest W. Gibson III, 92, American politician and jurist, Vermont state representative (1961–1963) and Justice of the Vermont Supreme Court (1983–1997).
Aleksandra Kornhauser Frazer, 93, Slovenian chemist.
Tatjana Lematschko, 72, Russian chess player.
Ratnakar Matkari, 81, Indian writer and film producer, COVID-19.
Mercedes Mendoza Suasti, 93, Ecuadorian pasillo singer.
Lucky Peterson, 55, American blues singer, keyboardist and guitarist.
Ken Retzer, 86, American baseball player (Washington Senators).
William K. Scarborough, 87, American historian.
George Brian Sinclair, 91, British army officer.
Peter Thomas, 94, German composer.
Sean Tyla, 73, English rock musician (Ducks Deluxe) and singer-songwriter.
William Whitehall, 85, American politician, member of the Missouri House of Representatives (1983–1987).
Yuri Zisser, 59, Belarusian web services executive, founder and owner of Tut.By.

18
Allan Acosta, 95, American engineer.
Minkailu Bah, Sierra Leonean politician.
Massimo Berta, 71, Italian footballer (Alessandria, Sambenedettese, Reggio Audace).
Karen Blumenthal, 61, American business journalist and author, heart attack.
Philip Bromberg, 89, American psychoanalyst.
Antonio Colomban, 88, Italian football player and manager (Messina), heart attack.
Mujibur Rahman Devdas, 90, Bangladeshi political activist and mathematician.
Marko Elsner, 60, Slovenian footballer (Red Star Belgrade, Nice, Yugoslavia national team).
Ronald T. Farrar, 84, American journalist and academic.
Jesse Freitas Sr., 99, American football player (San Francisco 49ers, Chicago Rockets, Buffalo Bills), cancer.
Cornel Georgescu, 64, Romanian football player and coach.
Rae Johnson, 67, Canadian painter, amyotrophic lateral sclerosis.
Saleh Abdullah Kamel, 79, Saudi Arabian conglomerate and banking executive, founder of Dallah Al-Baraka.
Leonard Levitt, 79, American crime reporter, lung cancer.
Vincent Malone, 88, English Roman Catholic prelate, Auxiliary Bishop of Liverpool (1989–2006), COVID-19.
Bill Olner, 78, British politician, MP (1992–2010), COVID-19.
Ken Osmond, 76, American actor (Leave It to Beaver, The New Leave It to Beaver) and police officer (Los Angeles Police Department), complications from COPD.
Raymond Ravenscroft, 88, English archdeacon.
Michelle Rossignol, 80, Canadian actress (Once Upon a Time in the East, Beyond Forty, You).
Susan Rothenberg, 75, American painter.
James Sherwood, 86, American-born British shipping executive.
Raman Pratap Singh, 69, Fijian politician, president of the National Federation Party (2005–2014).
Craig Welch, 71, Canadian animator (No Problem, How Wings Are Attached to the Backs of Angels), COVID-19.
Fred Wendt, 95, American football player (UTEP Miners).
Ben Williams, 65, American football player (Buffalo Bills, Ole Miss Rebels).
*Willie K, 59, American singer and ukulele player, lung cancer.

19
Richard Anuszkiewicz, 89, American artist.
Ken Burmeister, 72, American college basketball coach (Loyola Ramblers, UTSA Roadrunners, Incarnate Word Cardinals), cancer.
Peter Day, 81, British chemist.
Annie Glenn, 100, American disability rights activist and philanthropist, complications from COVID-19.
Chuck Graham, 55, American politician, member of the Missouri Senate (2005–2009) and House of Representatives (1997–2005), heart attack.
Pembroke J. Herring, 90, American film editor (Tora! Tora! Tora!, Bound for Glory, Out of Africa).
Carlos Jirón, 65, Nicaraguan politician, member of the National Assembly, complications from diabetes.
Peter Kiilu, Kenyan politician, MP (2007–2013).
Arvid Torgeir Lie, 81, Norwegian writer and poet.
Charley Lippincott, 80, American film marketing publicist, complications from a heart attack.
Stacey Milbern, 33, American disability rights activist, complications following surgery.
Ken Nightingall, 92, British film sound engineer (For Your Eyes Only, A View to a Kill, Octopussy), COVID-19.
Saeed Ahmad Palanpuri, 78, Indian Islamic scholar.
Mary-Anne Plaatjies van Huffel, 60, South African pastor and academic, complications from surgery.
Salah Stétié, 90, Lebanese writer and poet.
Norman G. Thomas, 90, American astronomer, complications from Alzheimer's disease.
John W. Turnbull, 84, Canadian politician.
Gil Vianna, 54, Brazilian politician, complications from COVID-19.
Ravi Zacharias, 74, Indian-born Canadian-American Christian apologist, spine cancer.

20
Syed Fazal Agha, 78, Pakistani politician, Governor of Balochistan (1999), COVID-19.
Emma Amos, 83, American painter and printmaker, complications from Alzheimer's disease.
Joe Beauchamp, 76, American football player (San Diego Chargers).
Anthony DiGiorgio, 79, American academic administrator, president of Winthrop University (1989–2013), pulmonary embolism.
Stephen A. DiMauro, 87, American jockey, horse breeder and trainer (Lady Pitt, Dearly Precious, Wajima), cancer.
Denis Farkasfalvy, 83, Hungarian-American Roman Catholic priest and theologian, COVID-19.
Ronald Giere, 82, American philosopher.
Malin Gjörup, 56, Swedish actress (Hello Baby) and operatic mezzo-soprano, cerebral haemorrhage. 
Wolfgang Gunkel, 72, German rower, Olympic champion (1972).
Juan Justo Amaro, 89, Uruguayan politician, Senator (2005–2010) and Deputy (1971–1973, 1985–1994).
William J. Keating, 93, American law firm executive and politician, member of the U.S. House of Representatives (1971–1974).
Wilbur MacDonald, 86, Canadian politician, MP (1979–1980).
Karl-Göran Mäler, 81, Swedish environmental economist.
Margaret Maughan, 91, British archer, swimmer and lawn bowler, Paralympic champion (1960, 1972).
Adolfo Nicolás, 84, Spanish Roman Catholic priest, Superior General of the Society of Jesus (2008–2016).
Howard C. Nielson, 95, American politician, member of the U.S. House of Representatives (1983–1991), Utah House of Representatives (1967–1975) and Senate (1997–2000).
Shaheen Raza, 60, Pakistani politician, Punjab MPA (since 2018), COVID-19.
George T. Ross, 70, American politician, member of the Massachusetts House of Representatives (2011–2013).
Gemma Salem, 76, Turkish-born Swiss writer.
Dan Simkovitch, 66, French actress (Les Mystères de l'amour, L'Opération Corned-Beef).
Trevor Stewart, 80, Australian cricketer (Queensland).
Gianfranco Terenzi, 79, Sammarinese politician, Captain Regent (1987–1988, 2000–2001, 2006, 2014–2015), traffic collision.
Hector Thompson, 70, Australian Hall of Fame boxer.
Surapong Tovichakchaikul, 67, Thai politician, Deputy Prime Minister (2012–2014) and Minister of Foreign Affairs (2011–2014), liver cancer.
Rakesh Verma, 59, Indian politician, Himachal Pradesh MLA, cardiac arrest.
Wan Weixing, 62, Chinese space physicist, member of the Chinese Academy of Sciences.

21
Naomi Brooks, 86, American educator and civil rights activist.
Bobby Digital, 59, Jamaican reggae and dancehall producer.
Mamoon al-Farkh, 62, Syrian actor (Bab Al-Hara), heart attack.
Alexander Gerasimov, 61, Russian ice hockey player, Olympic champion (1984).
Neil Howlett, 85, English operatic baritone.
Lluís Juste de Nin, 75, Spanish cartoonist and fashion designer (Armand Basi), cancer.
Markus Klaer, 51, German engineer and politician, member of the Abgeordnetenhaus of Berlin (2011–2016, since 2019).
Arnulf Kolstad, 78, Norwegian social psychologist.
Sergey Kramarenko, 97, Russian Air Force officer, Hero of the Soviet Union.
Lew Byong-hyun, 95, South Korean military officer and diplomat, Ambassador to the United States (1982–1985).
Lawrence Lindemer, 98, American politician and jurist, Michigan state representative (1951–1952) and Justice of the Michigan Supreme Court (1975–1977.
Maamaloa Lolohea, 51, Tongan Olympic weightlifter (2008).
Alan Merten, 78, American academic administrator, president of George Mason University (1996–2012), complications from Parkinson's disease.
Shirley McKague, 84, American politician, member of the Idaho House of Representatives (1996–2007) and Senate (2007–2012).
Freddy Michalski, 73, French translator.
Roberto Moya, 55, Cuban athlete, Olympic bronze medallist (1992).
Julitta Münch, 60, German television presenter (WDR).
John Murphy, 72, Irish Gaelic football player and manager.
Merlin Nunn, 89, Canadian judge, chief justice of the Nova Scotia Supreme Court (1982–2005).
Héctor Ochoa, 77, Argentine Olympic footballer (1964).
Jörg Ohm, 76, German footballer (1. FC Magdeburg, FC Sachsen Leipzig).
David Pawson, 90, English evangelical minister.
Kamrun Nahar Putul, Bangladeshi politician, COVID-19.
Gerhard Strack, 64, German footballer (1. FC Köln, FC Basel, national team), heart attack.
Oliver E. Williamson, 87, American economist, Nobel Prize laureate (2009), complications from pneumonia.
Douglas Tyndall Wright, 92, Canadian engineer and academic administrator, President of the University of Waterloo (1981–1993).
John Zdechlik, 83, American composer.

22
Zara Abid, 28, Pakistani model and actress (Chaudhry – The Martyr), plane crash.
Antonio Bonet Correa, 94, Spanish art historian.
André Cartier, 74, Canadian actor (Bound for Glory, Passe-Partout).
Heather Chasen, 92, British actress (Cat Run, Les Misérables).
Peter Harold Cole, 83, Australian electronic engineer.
Ashley Cooper, 83, Australian tennis player, four-time Grand Slam tournament singles champion, Australian Open (1957, 1958), US Open (1958), Wimbledon (1958).
Denise Cronenberg, 81, Canadian costume designer (The Fly, A History of Violence, Crash).
Robb Forman Dew, 73, American writer, complications from endocarditis.
Nancy Harrington, 94, American politician, member of the Florida House of Representatives (1974–1976).
Adam Henein, 91, Egyptian sculptor.
José Jacinto Hidalgo, 77, Venezuelan Olympic sprinter (1968).
Francine Holley, 100, Belgian-born French painter.
Mory Kanté, 70, Guinean singer and kora player ("Yé ké yé ké").
Jack Klotz, 87, American football player (New York Titans, San Diego Chargers, New York Jets, Houston Oilers).
William Lyon, 97, American major general.
Anatoliy Matviyenko, 67, Ukrainian politician, Governor of Vinnytsia Oblast (1996–1998) and Deputy (1990–1994, 1998–2012, 2014–2019).
Albert Memmi, 99, Tunisian-born French writer and essayist.
Miljan Mrdaković, 38, Serbian footballer (Metalist Kharkiv, OFK Beograd, Maccabi Tel Aviv), suicide.
Cristina Pezzoli, 56, Italian theatre director.
Hecky Powell, 72, American businessman, philanthropist and community leader, COVID-19.
Saturn, 83–84, American-born alligator (Berlin Zoological Garden, Battle of Berlin, Moscow Zoo).
Peter Schiller, 62, German Olympic ice hockey player (1988), heart failure.
Luigi Simoni, 81, Italian football player (Brescia) and manager (Napoli, Inter Milan), complications from a stroke.
Naipal Singh, 79, Indian politician, MP (2014–2019), cardiac arrest.
Jerry Sloan, 78, American basketball player (Chicago Bulls) and Hall of Fame coach (Utah Jazz), complications from Parkinson's disease and Lewy body dementia.
Dave Smith, 73, American football player (Pittsburgh Steelers, Houston Oilers, Kansas City Chiefs).
Richard Timberlake, 97, American economist.

23
Alberto Alesina, 63, Italian political economist, heart attack.
Richard Byerly, 81, American politician, member of the Iowa House of Representatives (1973–1983).
Maria Velho da Costa, 81, Portuguese writer (New Portuguese Letters).
Kåre Dæhlen, 93, Norwegian diplomat.
Valeriy Davydenko, 47, Ukrainian politician, Deputy (since 2014), shot.
John Eden, Baron Eden of Winton, 94, British politician, member of the House of Lords (1983–2015), MP (1954–1983).
Jennie Erdal, 69, Scottish novelist, melanoma.
Hana Kimura, 22, Japanese professional wrestler (Stardom, Wrestle-1) and reality TV personality (Terrace House: Tokyo 2019–2020), suicide by hydrogen sulfide.
Fabrice Lepaul, 43, French footballer (Auxerre, Saint-Étienne, Colmar), traffic collision.
Robert F. Mager, 96, American psychologist and author.
Jitendra Nath Pande, 79, Indian physician, COVID-19.
Brian Sharoff, 77, American politician and manufacturing executive, member of the New York State Assembly (1971–1976).
Eddie Sutton, 84, American Hall of Fame college basketball coach (Arkansas Razorbacks, Kentucky Wildcats, Oklahoma State Cowboys).
Johann Weber, 93, Austrian Roman Catholic prelate, Bishop of Graz-Seckau (1969–2001).
Bryan Wharton, 86, British photographer.
Edward A. Wilkinson, 86, American rear admiral.

24
Tom Arie, 86, Czech-born British psychiatrist.
Joe Bertram, 63, American politician.
Mukar Cholponbayev, 70, Kyrgyz politician, speaker of the Supreme Council (1995–1996), COVID-19.
Jimmy Cobb, 91, American jazz drummer (Miles Davis Quintet), lung cancer.
Jean-Loup Dabadie, 81, French journalist and screenwriter (Such a Gorgeous Kid Like Me, Courage fuyons, Clara et les Chics Types).
Warren DeBoer, 74, American anthropologist, esophageal cancer.
Arthur Dehaine, 87, French politician, Deputy (1976–1981, 1986–2002), mayor of Senlis (1974–2008).
Carlo Durante, 73, Italian marathon runner, Paralympic champion (1992), heart attack.
José Figueroa, 60, Honduran footballer (Real Murcia, Hércules, national team).
Mockbul Hossain, 70, Bangladeshi teaching hospital executive and politician, MP (1996–2001), COVID-19.
Jerry F. Hough, 85, American political scientist.
Robert K. Jaedicke, 91, American academic, Dean of the Stanford Graduate School of Business (1983–1990).
Hussain Ahmad Kanjo, Pakistani politician, Minister of Science and Technology (2002–2007), COVID-19.
Ron Landry, 76, American politician, member of the Louisiana State Senate (1976–2000).
Lily Lian, 103, French singer.
John Loengard, 85, American photographer. 
Lucia Mee, 20, Northern Irish organ donation campaigner, liver failure.
Biff Pocoroba, 66, American baseball player (Atlanta Braves).
Bruce Reid, 84, Australian politician, member of the House of Representatives (1990–1998).
Al Rex, 91, American bassist (Bill Haley & His Comets).
William J. Small, 93, American journalist, President of NBC News (1979–1982).
Zdena Tominová, 79, Czech novelist and political dissident.
Marshall Tymn, 82, American editor and academic, pneumonia.
Dinaldo Wanderley, 69, Brazilian politician and economist, COVID-19.

25
Bucky Baxter, 65, American guitarist (Bob Dylan, Steve Earle, Ryan Adams).
Joseph Bouasse, 21, Cameroonian footballer (Roma, Vicenza, Universitatea Cluj), heart attack.
Nadejda Brânzan, 71, Moldovan politician, MP (1990–1994).
Marcelino Campanal, 88, Spanish footballer (Sevilla, Deportivo de La Coruña, national team).
Otto de la Rocha, 86, Nicaraguan singer, songwriter and actor.
Francis Dufour, 91, Canadian politician, Quebec MNA (1985–1996).
Chris Dufresne, 62, American sports writer.
Louise Feltham, 85, Canadian politician, cancer.
George Floyd, 46, American police detainee, asphyxia.
Ismail Gamadiid, Somali politician, Minister of Agriculture, the Environment, and Climate Change of Puntland, COVID-19. (death announced on this date)
John Howley, 88, Australian painter.
Hyun Soong-jong, 101, South Korean politician, Prime Minister (1992–1993).
Jimmy Kirunda, 70, Ugandan football player (Express, KCC, national team) and manager, heart attack.
Renate Krößner, 75, German actress (Solo Sunny, Alles auf Zucker!).
Marv Luster, 82, American Hall of Fame CFL football player (Montreal Alouettes, Toronto Argonauts), COVID-19.
Bob Lynn, 87, American politician, member of the Alaska House of Representatives (2003–2017).
Paolo Mietto, 85, Italian-born Ecuadorian Roman Catholic prelate, Apostolic Vicar of Napo (1996–2010).
Balbir Singh Sr., 96, Indian field hockey player and manager, Olympic champion (1948, 1952, 1956) and World Cup winner (1975), complications from bronchopneumonia.
John Peter Sloan, 51, English comedian, theatre actor and writer, respiratory failure.
Vadão, 63, Brazilian football manager (Corinthians, women's national team), liver cancer.
Henri van Zanten, 63, Dutch artist.
Mary J. Wilson, 83, American zookeeper, COVID-19.
*Wu Pong-fong, 55, Taiwanese actor and choreographer, Golden Bell winner (2008, 2019), stroke.

26
Peter Alexander, 81, American sculptor (Light and Space).
Miguel Artola Gallego, 96, Spanish historian, Prince of Asturias Award (1991).
Michael Athans, 83, Greek-born American control theorist and professor.
Oscar Lino Lopes Fernandes Braga, 88, Angolan Roman Catholic prelate, Bishop of Benguela (1975–2008).
Sir John Brigstocke, 74, British admiral, Second Sea Lord (1997–2000).
Johanna Ehrnrooth, 61, Finnish painter.
Moysey Fishbein, 73, Ukrainian poet and translator.
Samvel Gasparov, 81, Russian film director (Hatred, The Sixth, Coordinates of Death) and short story writer, COVID-19.
Mauricio Hanuch, 43, Argentine footballer (Platense, Independiente, Olimpo), stomach cancer.
Jon Hellevig, 58, Finnish lawyer and businessman.
Richard Herd, 87, American actor (T. J. Hooker, All the President's Men, The China Syndrome), complications from cancer.
Irm Hermann, 77, German actress (Katzelmacher, The Merchant of Four Seasons, The Bitter Tears of Petra von Kant).
Floyd Hillman, 86, Canadian ice hockey player (Boston Bruins).
Stanley Ho, 98, Hong Kong-Macanese gambling executive and philanthropist, founder of Sociedade de Turismo e Diversões de Macau, kidney failure.
Oleh Hornykiewicz, 93, Austrian biochemist, Wolf Prize winner (1979).
Houdini, 21, Canadian rapper, shot.
Anthony James, 77, American actor (In the Heat of the Night, High Plains Drifter, Gunsmoke), cancer.
Prahlad Jani, 90, Indian breatharian monk.
İsmail Hakkı Karadayı, 88, Turkish military officer, Chief of the General Staff (1994–1998), multiple organ failure.
Geoff Kerr, 95, Australian VFL footballer.
Vladimir Lopukhin, 68, Russian politician, Minister of Energy (1991–1992), COVID-19.
Christian Mbulu, 23, English footballer (Brentwood Town, Motherwell, Morecambe).
Glyn Pardoe, 73, English footballer (Manchester City).
Cliff Pennington, 80, Canadian ice hockey player (1960).
Ejaz Qaiser, 68, Pakistani singer.
Tony Scannell, 74, Irish actor (Flash Gordon, The Bill).
Bonno Thoden van Velzen, 87, Dutch anthropologist.
Arumugam Thondaman, 55, Sri Lankan politician, MP (since 1994), heart attack.
Claire Nicolas White, 94, Dutch-born American poet and author.
Jonathan Whitehead, 59, English musician and composer.
Katie Wolf, 94, American politician, member of the Indiana House of Representatives (1984–1986) and Senate (1986–2000).

27
Tony Brown, 83, English cricketer (Gloucestershire).
Murilo Melo Filho, 91, Brazilian writer, lawyer and journalist, multiple organ failure.
Wally Gacek, 92, Canadian ice hockey player (Michigan Wolverines).
Bruno Galliker, 88, Swiss Olympic hurdler (1960).
Federico García Vigil, 79, Uruguayan composer and conductor.
Herbert Gross, 91, American mathematician.
Robert Hite, 63, American artist.
Jack Hunt, 97, American politician, member of the North Carolina House of Representatives (1973–1995).
Mujtaba Hussain, 83, Indian Urdu author and satirist.
Sam Johnson, 89, American politician, member of the U.S. (1991–2019) and Texas (1985–1991) Houses of Representatives.
Regis Korchinski-Paquet, 29, Canadian domestic violence victim, fall.
Larry Kramer, 84, American playwright (The Normal Heart) and LGBT rights activist, pneumonia.
Earl McCune, 63, American electrical engineer.
Liesbeth Migchelsen, 49, Dutch footballer (Heike Rheine, AZ Alkmaar, national team), cancer.
Aldo Nardin, 72, Italian footballer (Arezzo, Ternana, Lecce).
Evelyn Nicol, 89, American immunologist and microbiologist, complications from COVID-19.
Peri Vaevae Pare, Cook Islands politician, MP (1999–2006).
Hugh Parmer, 80, American politician, member of the Texas House of Representatives (1963–1965) and Senate (1983–1991), mayor of Fort Worth (1977–1979).
Peggy Pope, 91, American actress (9 to 5, Calucci's Department, The Last Starfighter).
Nicholas Rinaldi, 86, American poet and author (The Jukebox Queen of Malta, Between Two Rivers), pneumonia from COVID-19.
Glenn Roush, 86, American politician, member of the Montana House of Representatives (1981–1984) and Senate (1999–2011).
Peter V. Sampo, 89, American educator and academic.
Arthur L. Thurlow, 107, Canadian politician and judge, Nova Scotia MLA (1949–1953).
Billie Lee Turner, 95, American botanist, COVID-19.
Dario Vidošević, 52, Croatian Olympic rower (1984).
Vegard Vigerust, 94, Norwegian author.
Ubaidur Rahman Zia, Pakistani Islamic scholar.

28
Gracia Barrios, 92, Chilean painter.
Guy Bedos, 85, French actor (Sweet and Sour, Pardon Mon Affaire, Too!, All Together) and comedian, complications from Alzheimer's disease.
Jock Blair, Australian television writer and producer (Homicide, The Sullivans, Paradise Beach). (death announced on this date)
Brendan Bowyer, 81, Irish singer ("The Hucklebuck").
David Owen Brooks, 65, American serial killer, COVID-19.
Jim Brown, 93, Australian politician, Western Australian MLA (1971–1974) and MLC (1980–1992).
F. Enzio Busche, 90, German LDS Church general authority.
Gustaaf De Smet, 85, Belgian Olympic cyclist (1956).
Mary D'Imperio, 90, American cryptographer.
Celine Fariala Mangaza, 52, Congolese disability advocate, COVID-19.
Claude Goasguen, 75, French politician, Deputy (since 2012), COVID-19.
Gustavo Guillén, 57, Argentine actor (Chiquititas) and drummer, complications from prostate surgery.
Claude Heater, 92, American opera singer.
Vernon Kerr, 92, American politician, member of the New Mexico House of Representatives (1971–1986).
Bob Kulick, 70, American guitarist (W.A.S.P., Lou Reed) and record producer (Kiss).
M. P. Veerendra Kumar, 83, Indian journalist and politician, MP (1996–1998, 2004–2009, 2016–2017, since 2018), cardiac arrest.
Robert M. Laughlin, 85, American anthropologist and linguist (Tzotzil language), COVID-19.
Charlie Monttana, 58, Mexican rock urbano singer, heart attack.
Lennie Niehaus, 90, American saxophonist and film composer (Unforgiven, The Bridges of Madison County, Space Cowboys).
Wolfram Paulus, 62, Austrian film director (Heidenlöcher) and screenwriter, cancer.
Suzanne Roquette, 77, German actress.
Reed Scowen, 88, Canadian politician.
Paul Shrubb, 64, English football player (Brentford, Aldershot, Aldershot Town), manager and scout, motor neurone disease.
Jaroslav Švach, 47, Czech footballer (Zlín), stroke.
Ron Withem, 73, American politician, member of the Nebraska Legislature (1983–1997).

29
Maikanti Baru, 60, Nigerian crude oil marketer, Group Managing Director of Nigerian National Petroleum Corporation (2016–2019).
Henri Baudouin, 93, French politician, Deputy (1962–1986) and mayor of Granville (1961–1977, 1983–1989).
John Bermingham, 96, American politician, member of the Colorado Senate (1965–1973).
Henry Brault, 92, French Olympic runner (1952).
Christopher Brocklebank-Fowler, 86, British politician, MP (1970–1983).
Delores Brumfield, 88, American baseball player (South Bend Blue Sox, Kenosha Comets, Fort Wayne Daisies).
Walter Cahn, 86, German-born American medievalist and art historian.
Curtis Cokes, 82, American Hall of Fame boxer, WBA/WBC world welterweight champion (1966–1969), heart failure.
Bejan Daruwalla, 88, Indian astrology columnist, pneumonia.
Gilberto Dimenstein, 63, Brazilian journalist (Folha de S.Paulo), pancreatic cancer.
Evaldo Gouveia, 91, Brazilian singer and songwriter, COVID-19.
Ajit Jogi, 74, Indian politician, MP (1986–1999, 2004–2008), Chief Minister of Chhattisgarh (2000–2003) and Chhattisgarh MLA (2001–2013, since 2018), cardiac arrest.
Ron Johnston, 79, British geographer, heart attack.
Alfred Kolleritsch, 89, Austrian writer, poet and philosopher.
Jeanie Lambe, 79, Scottish jazz singer.
Leslie R. Lemon, 73, American meteorologist.
Sidney Locks, 71, American politician, member of the North Carolina House of Representatives (1982–1990).
Hank Mason, 88, American baseball player (Philadelphia Phillies).
Jerzy Pilch, 67, Polish journalist and writer, complications from Parkinson's disease.
Shahine Robinson, 66, Jamaican politician, MP (since 2001), lung cancer.
Eric Schreurs, 61, Dutch cartoonist, heart failure.
Bhanwar Lal Sharma, 95, Indian politician, member of the Rajasthan Legislative Assembly (1977–2003).
Louis P. Sheldon, 85, American Anglican priest.
Susie Simcock, 81, New Zealand sports administrator, president of the World Squash Federation (1996–2002).
Hank Stackpole, 85, American military officer.
Henk Steevens, 88, Dutch racing cyclist (1953 Tour de France), cancer.
Randy Staten, 76, American football player (New York Giants) and politician, member of the Minnesota House of Representatives (1981–1987).
Célio Taveira, 79, Brazilian footballer (Vasco da Gama, Nacional, national team), COVID-19.
Roosevelt Taylor, 82, American football player (Chicago Bears, San Francisco 49ers, Washington Redskins).
Ernest Wooton, 78, American politician, member of the Louisiana House of Representatives (2000–2012).
Joe Yeninas, 86, American cartoonist, illustrator and graphic editor.
Yogesh, 77, Indian lyricist (Anand, Manzilein Aur Bhi Hain, Manzil).
Darwin Young, 95, American politician, member of the Idaho House of Representatives (1977–1981).
Abderrahmane Youssoufi, 96, Moroccan politician, Prime Minister (1998–2002), lung cancer.

30
Yawovi Agboyibo, 76, Togolese politician, Prime Minister (2006–2007).
Michael Angelis, 76, British actor (Boys from the Blackstuff, The Liver Birds, Thomas & Friends), heart attack. 
John Cole, 91, Australian-born British geographer.
Sir John Coward, 82, British vice admiral, Commandant Royal College of Defence Studies (1992–1994) and Lieutenant Governor of Guernsey (1994–2000).
Phil Croyle, 70, American football player (Houston Oilers, Buffalo Bills), cancer.
Roger Decock, 93, Belgian racing cyclist, Tour of Flanders winner (1952).
Bobby Dimond, 90, Australian rugby league footballer (Western Suburbs, New South Wales, national team).
Elsa Dorfman, 83, American photographer, kidney failure.
Michel Gauthier, 70, Canadian politician, Leader of the Opposition (1996–1997), MP (1994–2007), and Quebec MNA (1981–1988), lung cancer.
Chick Gillen, 87, Irish boxer.
Xavier Grau i Masip, 69, Spanish artist, cancer.
Józef Grzesiak, 79, Polish Olympic bronze medallist boxer (1964).
Bob Hammond, 78, Australian Hall of Fame football player (North Adelaide, Norwood) and coach (Sydney Swans), complications from Parkinson's disease.
Fachtna Joseph Harte, 90, Irish priest.
Hassan Hosny, 88, Egyptian actor (Nasser 56, El-Limby, Bobbos), heart attack.
Kim Yong-un, 92, South Korean mathematician.
Mady Mesplé, 89, French operatic soprano, Parkinson's disease.
Bobby Morrow, 84, American Hall of Fame sprinter, triple Olympic champion (1956).
John Nzenze, 80, Kenyan musician, complications from stomach surgery.
Louise Page, 65, British dramatist, cancer.
Marshal Perera, 89, Sri Lankan politician.
Edward O. Phillips, 89, Canadian writer, heart failure.
Ana Portnoy, 69, Argentine photographer, cancer.
James Scurlock, 22, American protester, shot.
Trevor Thomas, 85, British historian.
Arnold Umbach, 77, American baseball player (Milwaukee/Atlanta Braves), complications from Parkinson's disease.
Don Weller, 79, English jazz saxophonist.
Károly Wieland, 86, Hungarian sprint canoeist, Olympic bronze medallist (1956).

31
Bob Bennett, 86, American Hall of Fame college baseball coach (Fresno State).
Carina Boberg, 68, Swedish actress.
Christo, 84, Bulgarian-born American artist (Running Fence).
Dennis L. Freeman, 81, American politician, complications from Parkinson's disease.
John Furnival, 87, British artist and teacher.
Kjell B. Hansen, 63, Norwegian politician.
Danny Havoc, 34, American professional wrestler (CZW), heart failure.
Dan van Husen, 75, German actor (Fellini's Casanova, Salon Kitty, Nosferatu the Vampyre), COVID-19.
Pedro Kozak, 71, Argentine football player and manager.
Norman Lamm, 92, American rabbi, President of Yeshiva University (1976–2003).
Osia Lewis, 57, American football player (Oregon State, Chicago Bruisers) and coach (Vanderbilt), liver cancer.
Lewis Marquardt, 83, American politician, member of the South Dakota House of Representatives (1969–1970).
Muhammad Yahya Rasool Nagari, 75, Pakistani Qāriʾ and Qira'at teacher. 
Bob Northern, 86, American jazz French hornist.
Tan Aik Mong, 70, Malaysian badminton player, Badminton Asia champion (1971).
David N. Ott, 83, American politician, member of the Maine House of Representatives (1990–1998, 2004–2006).
Badrul Feisal Abdul Rahim, 50, Malaysian businessman, Chairman of UMW Holdings (since 2015), heart attack.
Lia Schwartz, 78, Argentine-American literary scholar and historian.
Jayanendra Chand Thakuri, 80, Nepali actor (Kanchhi, Pheri Bhetaula, Tapasya).
Irene Triplett, 90, American woman, last living recipient of a Civil War pension.
William Vobach, 90, American politician, member of the Indiana Senate (1982–1990).
Peggy Wallace, 73, American politician, member of the Utah House of Representatives (2001–2006).

References

2020-05
 05